Milkcaps may refer to:

 Milk caps (game), a game
 Milk-cap, several species of mushroom-forming fungi